Hollywood High can mean:

Hollywood High (video game), a creative writing game released in 1996
Hollywood High (2003 film), a documentary film about the depiction of drug addiction in film
Hollywood High (1977 film), an American sex comedy film
Hollywood High School, a high school in Los Angeles, United States